Girt by Sea is a documentary film about the Australian coast which combines archive and crowd-sourced footage with an original soundtrack by The Panics.

The film was made using footage from the National Film and Sound Archive and ABC Archives along with crowd-sourced home movies contributed through social media. Its content spans 100 years of moving images.

The film 

Girt by Sea follows the format of From the Sea to the Land Beyond, also produced by Heather Croall. It explores the role the coast has played in Australia's national identity. It depicts surf lifesavers on Bondi Beach, shipbuilding in Whyalla, the Great Ocean Road, coral reefs off Queensland, the indigenous fishermen of Groote Eylandt, and Tasmania's sentinel lighthouses. It also shows darker moments such as whaling, the impact of colonisation, and changing views on immigration.

The film was commissioned by ABC TV Arts, Perth International Arts Festival, ScreenWest, Screen Australia and the National Film and Sound Archive.

The title comes from a line in the Australian national anthem, Advance Australia Fair, "Our home is girt by sea" with "girt" meaning surrounded by water.

Screenings 

The sold-out world premiere was at Perth International Arts Festival on 9 February 2014, with live accompaniment by The Panics.

It was broadcast on ABC 1 on 16 February 2014.

It was also screened as part of the Great Southern Festival and the Adelaide Guitar Festival.

References

External links 
 

2014 in Australian television
Australian documentary films
2014 documentary films
2014 films
Documentary films about Australia
Documentary films about nature
2010s English-language films